Alan Wagner (born 8 August 1989) is an Argentine professional golfer. As an amateur he won the Argentine Amateur Championship in 2005.

Amateur wins
2005 Argentine Amateur Championship

Professional wins (5)

Challenge Tour wins (1)

1Co-sanctioned by the Tour de las Américas

PGA Tour Latinoamérica wins (2)

Tour de las Américas wins (2)

1Co-sanctioned by the Challenge Tour

Ángel Cabrera Tour wins (1)

Team appearances
Amateur
 Eisenhower Trophy (representing Argentina): 2006
 Copa de las Americas (representing Argentina): 2007 (individual winner)

External links

Argentine male golfers
PGA Tour Latinoamérica golfers
European Tour golfers
Sportspeople from Buenos Aires
Argentine people of German descent
1989 births
Living people